Beerzel is a Belgian village in Antwerp Province and a deelgemeente of the municipality Putte. At , Antwerp's highest point—the Beerzelberg—is located in Beerzel.

History
Pottery from the early Bronze age had been discovered in Beerzel. The village was first mentioned as Barsale in 1151. Until the World War I, a large beech was located at the top of the Beerzelberg. Beerzel was an independent municipality until 1977 when it merged into Putte.

Notable people
 Jos Huysmans (1941–2012), road bicycle racer.

Gallery

References

External links 
 

Populated places in Antwerp Province
Putte